St James' Church, Halloughton is a Grade II listed parish church in the Church of England in Halloughton.

History

The church dates from the 13th century. It was restored between 1879 - 1882 by Ewan Christian.

It is in a joint parish with:
St Mary's Church, Bleasby
St Michael's Church, Hoveringham
Priory Church of St. Peter, Thurgarton

References

Church of England church buildings in Nottinghamshire
Halloughton